Vasileva Lake straddles the communes of Glogovac and Kosovo Polje.

Features
Rich in fish and flora alike, the lake has an island in the middle used by fishermen.

External links
 Vasileva "Fshati i pikur nga qielli", YouTube
 Vasileva Lake, OpenStreetMap

References

Lakes of Kosovo